Ochyrotica connexiva is a moth of the family Pterophoridae. It is found in Burma.

The forewings are snow-white with a golden brown pattern.

References

Moths described in 1891
Ochyroticinae
Moths of Asia
Taxa named by Thomas de Grey, 6th Baron Walsingham